Don Bosco High School, Baghchung is a Catholic school in Jorhat, Assam, India.

Location
Don Bosco High School, Baghchung, is located about ~5.5 km from Jorhat Town on Jorhat - Titabor road (SH32).

Academics
Don Bosco High School, Baghchung, Jorhat is a high school recognised by the Board of Secondary Education, Assam. and follows the state curricula and yearly planner. In 2022, the school conducts classes from Nursery to Class 12.

Subjects that are taught in the school include English, Assamese, Social Studies, Science, Mathematics, Advanced Mathematics, Computer Science, Geography, History, Moral Science, General Knowledge, Music and Hindi.

Facilities
The school has physics, biology and chemistry laboratories, and a computer lab with Windows (version remains unknown) computers. There is also a small hostel building with a capacity of about fifty students and a children's park.

References

External links
Official website

High schools and secondary schools in Assam
Christian schools in Assam
Education in Jorhat district
1970 establishments in Assam
Educational institutions established in 1970